Manasquan is a railway station in Manasquan, New Jersey, United States. It is served by trains on NJ Transit's North Jersey Coast Line. In May 2011, ticket machines were installed on both sides of the station depot at Manasquan. Commuter parking is free at the station, but it shares its lot with the customers of the pub adjacent to the station.

History 
The station originally opened in 1876 by the Central Railroad of New Jersey. In 1896, the depot was replaced by the one at Spring Lake. The depot was built out of wood from Philadelphia's agricultural exhibition in the celebration of the United States Centennial in 1876. The depot lasted on the site until March 30, 1996, when a fire ravaged the 120-year-old building while serving as the home of the local historical society. The station was demolished in May. A replacement depot, the one currently on the site, began construction in 2004.

Station layout
This station is not handicapped accessible. It consists of two tracks for each respective direction; the track corresponding to New York Penn Station-bound trains does not have a concrete platform and is reached by crossing the track corresponding to Bay Head-bound trains.

References

External links

Railway stations in Monmouth County, New Jersey
NJ Transit Rail Operations stations
Stations on the North Jersey Coast Line
Manasquan, New Jersey
Former New York and Long Branch Railroad stations
Railway stations in the United States opened in 1876
1876 establishments in New Jersey